"Bittersweet" is a song by British singer-songwriter Sophie Ellis-Bextor, written by Ellis-Bextor, James Wiltshire, Russell Small, Richard Stannard and Hannah Robinson for Ellis-Bextor's fourth studio album Make a Scene. The song was released as the album's third single on 3 May 2010, following two singles on which Ellis-Bextor collaborated, that also appear on Make a Scene.

Background
"Bittersweet" was premiered on the radio station Gaydar on 8 March 2010, and its video premiered on 23 March 2010 on Popjustice. The first live performance of "Bittersweet" took place at the Little World Festival in Méribel, France, on 17 March 2010. The song's B-side, "Sophia Loren", was, for a time, going to be the album's lead single; these plans were scrapped. It was written by Ellis-Bextor, Cathy Dennis and Chris Rojas, and produced by Rojas.

Critical reception
Critical reception to "Bittersweet" was positive. Popjustice declared it to be "completely above-average" and "pretty much the complete opposite of a crap pop record." "Bittersweet" was also favourably reviewed by Digital Spy and The New York Post. Digital Spy gave 5 stars to "Bittersweet", reviewing: "Last year's 'Heartbreak (Make Me A Dancer)' was a bona fide dancefloor delight, so it's little wonder that Sophie Ellis-Bextor (...) has teamed up with the Freemasons again for the first single from her upcoming fourth album. However, 'Bittersweet' is no twin sister to 'Heartbreak' (...) It's a big spangly club thumper with a pleasing hint of the '80s to it – the pop equivalent of that surprisingly elegant sequinned boob tube at the back of your mum's wardrobe." BBC Radio 1 gave "Bittersweet" 3 stars out of 5, stating "that voice is kind of striking, for a kick off: frosty and cold on the outside, but boiling with passion underneath. She's an anti-arctic roll, throatally speaking. And while there's no doubt as to her beauty and charm, she also looks a bit like an oil painting which has miraculously come to life. Lovely to look at, but somehow troubling too. These are all plus points, by the way". The review also makes a comparison to Girls Aloud's top 20 hit "Untouchable": "It's not that the two songs are so similar you can't tell them apart, but there's enough similarity there that a seasoned chartwatcher could probably predict what kind of reception one song would get, based on the success of the other. 'Untouchable' having been a relative disappointment for the Girls girls, just as they were riding off the back of their best single ever (...) it seems odd that Sophie would choose to go to a similar place and expect a different result." The Guardian made the song "Pick of the Week", and gave it 5 stars, stating that "Sophie Ellis-Bextor should seem rather old-fashioned in these days of Ke$ha sicking up her lunch in Paris Hilton's wardrobe and Gaga strapping 20 B&H on her face, but while faces come and go, tunes like this skyscraping electro disco-pop blockbuster never fall out of vogue. If you can't handle her fantastically nonchalant warbletones you're better off making a cup of tea for the tune's duration; but also think about where your life's headed because the signs, frankly, are not good". The single has been nominated for the 2010s Popjustice £20 Music Prize, coming in 3rd place in the finals. It also came in 14th position in the Popjustice Top 45 Singles of 2010.

Music video
The video for the song was filmed in London, United Kingdom on 12 March. It was directed by Chris Sweeney. The video premiered on 23 March on Popjustice's website. It shows Sophie in a bright studio and jumping in slow motion while flower petals and paint is throw to her and her dancers.

Another music video was re-released but this time including a remixed version of the video and the song, remix courtesy by Freemasons, this video was premiered at Armada Music's website.

Track listing
 UK CD single
"Bittersweet" – 3:26
"Sophia Loren" (Ellis-Bextor, Cathy Dennis, Chris Rojas) – 4:15

7" picture disc
"Bittersweet" – 3:26
"Bittersweet" (Freemasons Radio Mix) – 3:34

Digital download
"Bittersweet" – 3:26
"Bittersweet" (Freemasons Club Mix) – 5:05
"Bittersweet" (Jodie Harsh Extended Remix) – 6:32
"Bittersweet" (Freemasons Radio Mix) – 3:34
"Bittersweet" (Freemasons Extended Club Mix) – 8:55

Official remixes
"Bittersweet" (Freemasons Club Mix) – 5:05
"Bittersweet" (Freemasons Radio Mix) – 3:34
"Bittersweet" (Freemasons Extended Club Mix) – 8:55
"Bittersweet" (Freemasons Dub) – 7:57
"Bittersweet" (Freemasons Radio Mix) – 3:34
"Bittersweet" (Jodie Harsh Club Mix) – 6:32
"Bittersweet" (Jodie Harsh Dub) – 6:36
"Bittersweet" (Jodie Harsh Radio Mix) – 3:38

Chart performance

Release history

Live performances
 Little World Festival, Méribel, France – 17 March 2010
 The Album Chart Show – 15 April 2010
 GMTV film piece at Selfridges – 20 April 2010
 MTV Dance Take Over show – 24 April 2010
 Something for the Weekend – 25 April 2010
 Good Times – 26 April 2010
 GMTV – 29 April 2010
 4Music's The Crush – 1 May 2010
 G-A-Y – 1 May 2010
 The Beat (BBC Radio show) – 2 May 2010
 Loose Women – 5 May 2010
 G-A-Y – 5 May 2010
 Live from Studio Five – 7 May 2010
 Saturday Kitchen – 8 May 2010
 Koko Pop – 8 May 2010
 Frock Me – 15 May 2010
 Orsay Fashion Show, Warsaw, Poland – 19 May 2010
 Efes Pilsen One Love Festival, Istanbul, Turkey – 20 June 2010

References

External links
Official website

Songs written by Sophie Ellis-Bextor
Songs written by Hannah Robinson
Songs written by Richard Stannard (songwriter)
Song recordings produced by Richard Stannard (songwriter)
2010 songs
Sophie Ellis-Bextor songs
Fascination Records singles